Sagema is a fungal genus in the family Lecanoraceae. It is a monotypic genus, containing a single species, the crustose lichen Sagema potentillae, found in Nepal. Both the genus and species were described in 1993 by lichenologists Josef Poelt and Martin Grube.

The genus name of Sagema is named after Sabine and Georg Miehe, as Georg Miehe (b.1952) was A German Geographer and Botanist and Professor of (Bio-)Geography in Marburg, Germany.

References

Lecanoraceae
Lichen genera
Monotypic Lecanorales genera
Taxa described in 1993
Taxa named by Josef Poelt